This is a list of U.S. college men's soccer coaches with 400+ wins.

Dr. Jay Martin, head coach at Ohio Wesleyan University, is the all-time leader in wins, finishing the 2019 season, with a record of 723–150–74.

College men's soccer coaches with 400 wins

Key

Coaches
''statistics are correct through the end of the 2020 season.

See also
National Soccer Coaches Association of America

References

Soccer, Men's